The Jawahar Circle is a garden traffic circle and heavily trafficked intersection in the city of Jaipur, India built by the Jaipur Development Authority.

Overview
Jawahar Circle is claimed to be the biggest circular park in Asia developed on a highway traffic circle. It is situated along Malviya Nagar near Sanganer Airport on Jawaharlal Nehru Marg.

This park was fully developed by JDA (Jaipur Development Authority), and is one of Jaipur's popular leisure destinations. There are multiple concentric tracks in the park. It is surrounded by Rose Gardens.

JDA has spent 170 lacs for the further development of this circle, planning to include a number of new features, such as musical fountains, walkways, parking spaces, landscaping, modern play equipment, and jogging tracks.

The Fountain has been installed in a water-body in the center of the park. Every evening at 7 pm a show is held for 30 minutes, when the water sprays with the rhythm of the music and is illuminated by colored lights. Taking a hint from the Si-Fi world, they now show music videos on a wall of spray.

There are 290 effects. There are 316 colored lights. The video  projector is 15,000 lumens.

Rajasthan is a desert state, and to maintain such big gardens and fountains with drinking water would be foolhardy, so the government is using re-cycled water. Though safe for the garden, the fountain is definitely not safe for drinking or for bathing with.

References

External links 
 Jawahar Circle - Map

Roundabouts and traffic circles
Gardens in Rajasthan
Road junctions in India
Neighbourhoods in Jaipur
Parks in Jaipur
Monuments and memorials to Jawaharlal Nehru
Areas of Jaipur